
Apt, in Egyptian, may refer to:

 wpwtj or jpwtj, sometimes called Aput, Ȧp-t, or Ȧpu-t in outdated literature, the Egyptian word for ‘messenger’, sometimes used as an epithet for various gods.
 Ipet, sometimes called Ȧpit, Apt, Apet, Aptu, Epet, Opet, or Ȧpȧpit in outdated literature, a hippopotamus goddess commonly identified with Taweret.

References

Citations

Bibliography
 
 
 See also: Liber 777, revised 2003, p. 7

Egyptian gods